Chlorovibrissea is a genus of six or more aquatic or semi-aquatic fungi in the family Vibrisseaceae. Most species are found in Australasia but C. chilensis, described as new to science in 2014, is from South America and C. korfii is from China.

References

External links

Helotiales genera